Michael "Mikey" Eric Reid (born December 30, 1992) is an American actor. He appeared on Saturday Night Live, Last Call with Carson Daly, Late Show with David Letterman and other television shows. From 2010 to 2013 he played Sinjin Van Cleef on Victorious.

Reid appeared in Mamaboy as Ditto, the best friend of the lead character Kelly Hankins, a high school student who must hide the fact that he has become pregnant.

Personal life
Reid was born in The Bronx, New York City and grew up in Yonkers, New York. He is Jewish.

Filmography

Films

Television

References

External links 
 
 

1992 births
Living people
American male child actors
American male film actors
American male television actors
Jewish American male actors